The Ministry of Education and Research is a government ministry of Estonia, responsible for the planning and carrying out education, research, youth, and language policies, developing the national curricula and other educational standards and performing state supervision over the compliance of national curricula and other educational standards and educational institutions. Its head office is in Tartu and it also maintains offices in the capital, Tallinn. The current Minister of Education and Research is Tõnis Lukas.

See also
Minister of Education and Research

References

External links
 

Education and Research